Vicky, Vicko, 
Vick, Vickie or Vicki is a feminine given name, often a hypocorism of Victoria. The feminine  name Vicky in Greece comes from the name Vasiliki.

Women
 Family nickname of Victoria, Princess Royal (1840–1901), wife of German Emperor Frederick III, mother of Emperor Wilhelm II and daughter of Queen Victoria of Great Britain
 Vicki Adams (born 1989), Scottish curler
 Vicki Adams (born 1951) Rodeo performer
 Victoria Vicki Barr (athlete) (born 1982), British sprinter
 Victoria Vicky Beeching (born 1979), British musician and religious commentator
Vicki Berner (1945–2017), Canadian tennis player
 Victoria Vicky Binns (born 1981), English actress
 Vicky Botwright (born 1977), English squash coach and former player
 Vicki Brown (1940–1991), English singer born Victoria Haseman
 Victoria Vicky Bullett (born 1967), American college head basketball coach and retired Women's National Basketball Association player
 Vicki Butler-Henderson (born 1972), British racing driver
 Vicki Cardwell (born 1955), Australian retired squash player, former world no. 1
 Vickie Chapman (born 1957), Australian politician and lawyer
 Vicki Cruse (1967–2009), American aerobatic pilot and administrator
 Vicky Darling (born 1966), Australian politician
 Victoria Vicky Entwistle (born 1968), English actress best known for her work on the soap opera Coronation Street
 Vicky Exley (born 1975), British former footballer
 Vicky Ford (born 1967), British politician
 Vicky Foxcroft (born 1977), British politician
 Vicky Galindo (born 1983), American softball player
 Ondrea Gates (born 1962), American professional female bodybuilder
 Vickie Gates (actress), British actress
 Vickie Guerrero (born 1968), American professional wrestling personality
 Vicky Hartzler (born 1960), American politician
 Vicky Hadjivassiliou (born 1971), Greek author and politician
 Vicky Holland (born 1986), English triathlete
 Vicky Hurst (born 1990), American LPGA golfer
 Vicki Jensen, American politician elected to the Minnesota Senate in 2012
 Victoria Vicky Jenson (born 1960), film director of live-action and animated films, most notably Shrek
 Vickie Johnson (born 1972), American retired Women's National Basketball Association player
 Vicky Kaya (born 1978), Greek model and television presenter
 Victoria Vicky Kippin (born 1942), Australian former politician
 Vicky Knight, English film actress
 Vicky Lau, Hong Kong chef
 Victoria Vicki Lawrence (born 1949), American actress, comedian and singer
 Vicky Leandros, stage name of Greek-German singer Vassiliki Papathanasiou (born 1949 or 1952)
 Maria Victoria Vicky Losada (born 1991), Spanish footballer
 Victoria Vicky Lupton (born 1972), British retired race walker
 Vicky Maeijer (born 1986), Dutch politician
 Vicky McClure (born 1983), English actress
 Vickie D. McDonald (born 1947), American politician and Nebraska state senator
 Vicky McGehee (fl. 1997–present), American country music songwriter
 Vicky Morales (born 1969), Filipino newscaster
 Vasiliki Vicky Moscholiou (1943–2005), Greek singer
 Vickie Natale (born 1980), American singer
 Vicki Nelson-Dunbar (born 1962), American former tennis player
 Victoria Vickie Orr (born 1967), American retired basketball player
 Vickie Panos (1920–????), Canadian All-American Girls Professional Baseball League player
 Vicky Parnov (born 1990), Australian pole vaulter
 Victoria Vicki Peterson (born 1958), American rock guitarist, singer and songwriter, member of The Bangles
 Vicky Phelan (1974 – 2022), Irish healthcare campaigner
 Vicky Pryce, disgraced Greek-born British economist born Vasiliki Kourmouzi in 1952
 Vicki Schmidt (born 1955), American politician
 Vicky Theodoridou (born 1982), Greek handball player
 Vicky Vanita (died 2007), Greek actress
 Vicky Victory, stage name of female professional wrestler Peach Janae from the Gorgeous Ladies of Wrestling
 Victoria Vicki Van Meter (1982–2008), American aviator
 Vicky Vilagos (born 1963), Canadian synchronized swimmer
 Vicki Ward (born 1969), Australian politician
 Victoria Vicky Ward, British-born author, journalist, columnist, television commentator and editor
 Vicki Wickham (born 1939), English talent manager, entertainment producer and songwriter
 Vickie Winans, American gospel singer born Viviane Bowman in 1953
 Vicky Wright (born 1993), Scottish curler
 Vicki Young, British journalist

Men
 Vicky Peretz (1953–2021), Israeli association football player and manager
 Vicky Varun (born Santhosh Kumar R in 1990, also credited as Vikky Varun), Kannada-language Indian film actor

Pen name
 Victor Weisz, Hungarian-British cartoonist who used the pen name Vicky

Fictional characters
 Vicky Austin, in eight books by Madeleine L'Engle
 the title character of the 2008 film Vicky Cristina Barcelona, written and directed by Woody Allen
 Victoria "Vicky" Bradford, a character on the TV sitcom Three's a crowd
 Victoria Vicki Fowler, on the British soap opera EastEnders
 Victoria Vicky Hudson, on the American soap operas Another World and As the World Turns
 Victoria Vicki Vale, a DC Comics character associated with Batman
 Vicki (Doctor Who), on the BBC TV series Doctor Who
 Vicky (The Fairly OddParents), a French-American sadistic teenage villain on the Nickelodeon animated series The Fairly OddParents
 The title character of Vicky the Viking, an animated series, and Vicky the Viking (film), a 2009 live action adaptation
 Vicky Hotchner, a character in the 1998 American science-fiction disaster movie Deep Impact
 Vicki Lawson, a character on the TV sitcom Small Wonder
 Victoria "Vicky" McGee, a character played by Heather Locklear in the 1984 American science fiction horror movie Firestarter
 Vicky Wedge, a racist former politician in the Darren Shan zombie apocalyptic novel series Zom-B
 Vickie, a character in the Netflix television Stranger Things.

Other uses 

 Victoria: An Empire Under the Sun, or its successor games of Victoria II or Victoria 3, a series of historical grand strategy games published by Paradox Interactive
 Vicki (1953 film), an American crime drama film noir
 Vicky (1959 film), a Philippine drama film
 Vicky (1973 film), a Canadian television film
 Vicky (2022 film), an Irish documentary film

See also
 Vicci
 Vici (disambiguation)
 Vicky & Johnny, South Korean-Spanish series of animated shorts 
 Victor
 Victoria
 Viki (disambiguation)
 Vikki (disambiguation)

Feminine given names
Hypocorisms
English feminine given names
Dutch feminine given names